The Legend of the Condor Heroes is a Hong Kong wuxia television series adapted from Louis Cha's novel of the same title. It was first broadcast on TVB Jade in Hong Kong in 1983. The 59 episodes long series is divided into three parts.The serial was re-aired in 1990, 1995, 2012, and 2013 on TVB Jade.

This 1983 version is considered by many to be a classic television adaptation of the novel and features the breakthrough role of Barbara Yung, who played Huang Rong, During that time, Barbara Yung immediately became tvb's most popular actress.

The series became the highest rated series of that year with a high rating of 99%, The series averaged a rating of 65 points, and has become the most watched series in Hong Kong history so far. 

In 1985, it was introduced and broadcast in mainland China by Guangdong TV Station, which triggered a frenzy of people watching it and caused a great sensation.and one of the most watched TVB series by Chinese people in Hong Kong, Southeast Asia and around the world.

In 2022, the drama was selected as one of ten classic TVB dramas being honoured for a new joint Youku and TVB programme.

Cast

 Note: Some of the characters' names are in Cantonese romanisation.

 Felix Wong as Kwok Ching 郭靖
 Fung Chi-fung as young Kwok Ching
 Michael Miu as Yeung Hong 杨康
 Barbara Yung as Wong Yung 黄蓉
 Sharon Yeung as Muk Nim-chi 穆念慈
 Patrick Tse as Yeung Tit-sum 杨铁心
 Louise Lee as Bau Sik-yeuk 包惜弱
 Lau Kong as Yuen-ngan Hung-lit 完颜洪烈
 Chu Tit-wo as Kwok Siu-tin 郭啸天
 Soh Hang-suen as Lei Ping 李萍
 Chun Wong as Chow Pak-tung 周伯通
 Lau Dan as Hung Tsat-kung 洪七公
 Yeung Chak-lam as Au-yeung Fung 欧阳锋
 Kenneth Tsang as Wong Yeuk-si 黄药师
 Lau Siu-ming as Yat-dang
 Ha Yu as Yau Chui-kai
 Kong Ngai as Or Chan-ngok
 Benz Hui as Chu Cung
 Bobby Tsang as Hon Bo-kui
 Tam Chuan-hing as Nam Hei-yan
 Eddy Ko as Chuen Gam-fat
 Ban Ban as Hon Siu-ying
 Cheung Lui as Jebe
 Paul Chun as Genghis Khan
 Wong Jo-see as Wah-tsang
 Lee Ka-wing as young Wah-tsang
 Andy Dai as Tolui
 Lee Ka-ho as young Tolui
 Eddie Kwan as Chagatai
 Lin Wai-kin as Muqali
 Tam Bing-man as Jamukha
 Bonnie Wong as Mui Chiu-fung
 Yeung Yim-tong as Chan Yuen-fung
 Stephan Yip as Yuen-ngan Hung-hei
 Wong Wan-choi as Au-yeung Hak
 Chan Ka-yee as Fung Hang
 Chan On-ying as Sor-ku
 Shih Kien as Kau Chin-yan
 Regina Tsang as Lau Ying
 Rebecca Chan as Ching Yiu-ga
 Kwan Hoi-san as Luk Sing-fung
 Austin Wai as Luk Koon-ying
 Alan Chui Chung-San as Guanyan Bodyguard
 Bak Man-biu as Leung Tsi-yung
 Chan Tik-hak as Sa Tong-tin
 Cheung Ying-choi as Ma Yuk
 Rainbow Ching as Suen But-yee
 Leung Siu-tik as Wong Chui-yat
 Cheng Ka-sang as Kwok Dai-tong
 Bobby Au-yeung as a guard in the Luk Manor
 Francis Ng
 Wilson Tsui
 Stephen Chow (minor roles)
 Wong Yat-fei
 Hui Kin-shun

Episodes

 Part 1: The Legend of the Condor Heroes – The Iron-Blooded Loyalists (射鵰英雄傳之鐵血丹心) 
 Part 2: The Legend of the Condor Heroes – The Eastern Heretic and Western Venom (射鵰英雄傳之東邪西毒) 
 Part 3: The Legend of the Condor Heroes – The Duel on Mount Hua (射鵰英雄傳之華山論劍)

Soundtrack
The Legend of the Condor Heroes (射鵰英雄傳 seh diu ying hung juen) is the soundtrack of this television series, released in 1983 by EMI Records (百代唱片). Roman Tam and Jenny Tseng sing the following songs, most which are heard in the series.

Production

According to the behind-the-scenes featurette on the DVD, the Mongolian scenes were filmed on Lantau Island, Hong Kong.

Awards 
This is the award this series has received.

References

External links
 

TVB dramas
1983 Hong Kong television series debuts
1983 Hong Kong television series endings
Television shows based on The Legend of the Condor Heroes
Television series set in the Southern Song
Television series set in the Jin dynasty (1115–1234)
Television series set in the Mongol Empire
Hong Kong wuxia television series
Hong Kong action television series
Martial arts television series
Depictions of Genghis Khan on television
Television shows set in Hangzhou
1980s Hong Kong television series
Cantonese-language television shows